Colin Bostock-Smith (born 1942) is a British television and radio comedy writer.

Early career
Until the age of 30, he was a journalist, noting in a review of an early performance by The Beatles ("four young men with four fringes, three guitars, and some drums") that they were "not nearly as bad as they might have been". He later edited the music newspaper Top Pops.  However, he always had—in his words—"this feeling that I would like to write comedy", starting in this area with contributions to the BBC Radio 4 show Week Ending.

Bostock-Smith has contributed to a significant number of British television comedies. In a 2008 interview, he noted that he was the sole writer of all 41 episodes of the early-1980s ITV sitcom Metal Mickey, and claims to be most proud of his work on Not the Nine O'Clock News and the sitcom Me and My Girl.

Selected credits

Writing contributions

 Not the Nine O'Clock News
 Smith and Jones
 Clive James (The Clive James Show, Friday Night Clive, Saturday Night Clive)
 Basil Brush
 Metal Mickey (Wrote all 41 episodes)
 Terry and June
 Week Ending
 Punchlines (for BBC Radio 2)
 My Sainted Aunt (for BBC Radio 2)
 Bruce Forsyth's Big Night
 The Two Ronnies
 Shelley
 Crackerjack ("The Krankies! I wrote a lot for The Krankies")
 Me and My Girl
 Roland Rat
 Naked Video
 Trouble in Mind
 Who Dares Wins
 Russ Abbot
 The Odd Job (novelisation of the 1978 film)

Other
 As Time Goes By (Bostock-Smith claims he only came up with the original concept, saying "I’ve never written a word of it. [..] I didn’t even write the title. It was my idea, you see.")

References 

1942 births
Living people
British comedy writers